John McFadden (born November 4, 1951) is a former American professional stock car racing driver. McFadden competed in 11 total NASCAR Cup Series races, 4 NASCAR Xfinity Series starts, and 11 ARCA starts. McFadden was noted in the 1992 NASCAR Winston Cup Series for entering races with low car counts in a backup car fielded by Jimmy Means, a precursor to the practice of start and park.

References

External links
 

Living people
1951 births
Racing drivers from North Carolina
People from Forest City, North Carolina
NASCAR drivers